The Artificial Intelligence of Things (AIoT) is the combination of Artificial intelligence (AI) technologies with the Internet of things (IoT) infrastructure to achieve more efficient IoT operations, improve human-machine interactions and enhance data management and analytics.

In 2018, KPMG published a foresight study on the future of AI including scenarios until 2040. The analysts describe a scenario in detail where a community of things would see each device also contain its own AI that could link autonomously to other AIs to, together, perform tasks intelligently. Value creation would be controlled and executed in real-time using swarm intelligence. Many industries could be transformed with the application of swarm intelligence, including: automotive, cloud, medical, military, research, and technology.

In the AIoT an important facet is AI being done on some Thing. In its purest form this involves performing the AI on the device, i.e. at the edge or Edge Computing, with no need for external connections. There is no need for an Internet in AIoT, it is an evolution of the concept of the IoT and that is where the comparison ends.

The combined power of AI and IoT, promises to unlock unrealized customer value in a broad swath of industry verticals such as edge analytics, autonomous vehicles, personalized fitness, remote healthcare, precision agriculture, smart retail, predictive maintenance, and industrial automation.

Artificial Intelligence Through Medical Devices 
As defined by the 21st Century Cures Act in 2016, a medical device is a device that performs a function in healthcare with the intention of using it "in the diagnosis of disease or other conditions, or in the cure, mitigation, treatment, or prevention of disease, in man or other animals, or intended to affect the structure or any function of the body of man or other animals".

Under the Federal Food, Drug, and Cosmetic Act, all AI systems falling within this definition are regulated by the FDA. Medical devices are classified into three classes by the FDA based on their uses and risks. The higher the risk is, the stricter the control. The Class I category includes devices with the smallest risk and Class III has the greatest risk. Approved medical devices that utilize artificial intelligence or machine learning (AI/ML) has been increasing steadily. By 2020, the United States The Food and Drug Administration (FDA) approved very many medical devices that utilized AI/ML. A year later, the FDA released a regulatory framework for machines that use AI/ML software, in addition to the EU medical device regulation, which replaced the EU medical. As technology continues to improve, it has rapidly increased the medical fields' method of working and diagnosing. Various AI applications can improve productivity and reduce medical errors, such as diagnoses and treatment selection, and creating risk predictions and stratifying diseases.

AI also helps patience by providing patients' data, electronic health records, mobile apps, and providing easy access to devices and sensors to specific patients who are in need of such technologies. The need to protect patients' data is extreme. Using electronic records to conceal patient data becomes increasingly difficult as data becomes integrated into clinical care. The accessibility to patients' data may be easy to access for the patient, but it also brings skepticism of data protection.

Technology and AI have combined to provide opportunities for better management of healthcare information and technology integration in the medical industry. AI is implemented to recognize abnormalities and suspicion to sensitive data being accessed by a third-party. On the other hand, it will be necessary to rethink confidentiality and other core medical ethics principles in order to implement deep learning systems, since we cannot rely solely on technology.

Artificial Intelligence in Cloud Engineering 
When integrating AI into cloud engineering, it can help multiple professional fields in maximizing data collection. It can improve performance and efficiency through digital management.

Cloud engineering follows engineering methods to apply to cloud computing and focuses on technological cloud services. In conceiving, developing, operating, and maintaining cloud computing systems, it adopts a systematic approach to commercialization, standardization, and governance. Among its diverse aspects are contributions from development engineering, software engineering, web development, performance engineering, security engineering, platform engineering, risk engineering, and quality engineering.

Implementing AI into information technology's framework to establish smooth workloads and automate repetitive processes. Using these tools, organizations can better manage data as they develop greater amounts of collective data and integrate data recognition, classification, and management processes as time progresses.

With AI, it can bring efficiency to organizations, bringing strategic methods and saving time from repeated tasks. By executing analysis, organizations can save time and be more efficient.

See also
 Artificial intelligence
 Medical Device - Artificial Intelligence
 Cloud Computing - Cloud Engineering
 Internet of things
 Edge Computing

References

Internet of things